Alexis Alexandrou (born 12 July 1973) is a retired Cypriot football striker.

References

1973 births
Living people
Cypriot footballers
APOEL FC players
Ethnikos Achna FC players
Association football forwards
Cyprus international footballers
Cypriot First Division players